The Heart of a German Mother is a 1926 German silent drama film directed by Géza von Bolváry and starring Margarete Kupfer, Heinz Rühmann, and Julius Messaros. The film marked Rühmann's debut, beginning a screen career that lasted until his death in 1994.

Cast
Margarete Kupfer as Witwe Erdmann
Heinz Rühmann as Oscar
Julius Messaros as Julius
Ellen Kürti as Kellnerin
Vera Voronina
Helene von Bolváry
Carl Walther Meyer
Leon Epp
Max Weydner

References

External links

Films of the Weimar Republic
1926 drama films
German silent feature films
German drama films
Films directed by Géza von Bolváry
German black-and-white films
Silent drama films
1920s German films
1920s German-language films